"Da Art of Storytellin' (Pt. 1)" is the third and final single from hip-hop duo Outkast's third studio album Aquemini. The song was released as a single on May 25, 1999, but failed to chart on the Billboard Hot 100. It peaked at #67 on the Hot R&B/Hip-Hop Songs chart. Only the single version of the song features Slick Rick, with his verse completely cut from the album version. This song is not to be confused with Slick Rick's album The Art of Storytelling, released on the same day. This song was sampled in J. Cole's song "Land of the Snakes" from his studio album Born Sinner.

"Da Art of Storytellin' (Pt. 1)" is widely considered one of Outkast's best songs. In 2020, The Ringer ranked the song number nine on their list of the 50 greatest Outkast songs, and in 2021, The Guardian ranked the song number four on their list of the 20 greatest Outkast songs.

Track listing
 CD Single
 "Da Art Of Storytellin'" (Clean Mix) - 4:14
 "Da Art Of Storytellin'" (Instrumental)- 4:10
 "Da Art Of Storytellin'" (Call Out Research Hook) - 0:10

 Maxi Single
 "Da Art Of Storytellin'" (Album Version) - 4:11
 "Da Art Of Storytellin'" (Featuring Slick Rick - Single Version) - 4:10
 "Da Art Of Storytellin'" (Featuring Slick Rick - Acapella) - 4:06
 "SpottieOttieDopaliscious" (Album Version) - 3:30

 12" Vinyl Single
 "Da Art Of Storytellin'" (Clean Mix) - 4:14
 "Da Art Of Storytellin'" (Instrumental) - 4:11
 "Da Art Of Storytellin'" (Dirty Mix) - 4:11
 "Da Art Of Storytellin'" (Acapella) - 4:06

Charts

References

1999 singles
Outkast songs
Slick Rick songs
1998 songs
Songs written by André 3000
Songs written by Big Boi
LaFace Records singles
Arista Records singles
Songs written by Slick Rick
Music videos featuring puppetry